Juan Manuel García García (born 20 February 1993), commonly known as Juanma, is a Spanish footballer who plays for Albacete Balompié as a forward.

Club career
Born in La Rinconada, Province of Seville, Juanma played youth football for local Real Betis, and made his senior debuts while on loan at Coria CF in the 2012–13 season, in Tercera División. After the expiry of his loan he was released and joined CD Alcalá also in the fourth level.

After netting seven times in only 13 matches, Juanma returned to Betis, being initially assigned to the reserves in the same division. He appeared in his first official game with the Andalusians' main squad on 2 March 2014, coming on as a substitute for Juanfran in the 76th minute of a 1–1 La Liga away draw against Villarreal CF.

After leaving Betis in 2017, Juanma represented Segunda División B sides CD Badajoz, Marbella FC and Burgos CF, achieving promotion to Segunda División with the latter in 2021. He scored his first professional goals at the age of 28 on 5 September 2021, netting a brace in a 3–0 home win over Real Valladolid.

On 23 July 2022, Juanma signed a three-year contract with Albacete Balompié also in the second tier.

References

External links

Beticopedia profile 

1993 births
Living people
People from Seville (comarca)
Sportspeople from the Province of Seville
Spanish footballers
Footballers from Andalusia
Association football forwards
La Liga players
Segunda División players
Segunda División B players
Tercera División players
Betis Deportivo Balompié footballers
Real Betis players
CD Badajoz players
Marbella FC players
Burgos CF footballers
Albacete Balompié players